The Northern South Sulawesi languages are a subgroup of the South Sulawesi languages in the Austronesian language family. They are spoken in an area that stretches from the western peninsula of Sulawesi to the Gulf of Bone. Its most prominent members are Mandar and Toraja.

Classification
Northern South Sulawesi is divided into five branches:
Mandar
Mamuju
Pitu Ulunna Salu
Aralle-Tabulahan
Bambam
Dakka
Pannei
Ulumanda’
Massenrempulu
Duri
Enrekang
Maiwa
Malimpung
Toraja
Kalumpang
Mamasa (including Pattae')
Tae’
Talondo’
Toraja-Sa’dan
The Pitu Ulunna Salu, Massenrempulu and Toraja branches were already recognized by van der Veen (1929) as distinct units.

References

External links
 Northern South Sulawesi at Ethnologue (23rd ed., 2020).

Languages of Sulawesi
South Sulawesi languages